The 2014 Night of Champions was the eighth annual Night of Champions professional wrestling pay-per-view (PPV) and livestreaming event produced by WWE. It took place on September 21, 2014, at the Bridgestone Arena in Nashville, Tennessee, and was the first Night of Champions event to air on the WWE Network, which launched in February. The theme of the event was that every championship promoted on WWE's main roster at the time was defended.

Eight matches were contested at the event. Of the five championships contested, three changed hands. The main event saw John Cena defeat Brock Lesnar by disqualification, after Money in the Bank holder Seth Rollins interfered in the match by attacking Cena, thus Lesnar retained his WWE World Heavyweight Championship. The event also saw AJ Lee defeat defending champion Paige and Nikki Bella to win her record-tying third WWE Divas Championship. This was also the last WWE PPV to date to feature Justin Roberts as a ring announcer as he would be released the following month. The event had 48,000 buys (excluding WWE Network views). The previous year's drew 175,000 buys.

Production

Background
Night of Champions was an annual pay-per-view (PPV) event produced by WWE since 2007. The 2014 event was the eighth event in the Night of Champions chronology. It was held on September 21, 2014, at the Bridgestone Arena in Nashville, Tennessee. In addition to traditional PPV, it was the first Night of Champions to air on WWE's online streaming service, the WWE Network, which launched earlier that year in February. As per the theme of the event, every championship promoted on WWE's main roster at the time was defended. These included the WWE World Heavyweight Championship, the Intercontinental Championship, the United States Championship, the WWE Tag Team Championship, and the WWE Divas Championship.

Storylines
The card consisted of eight matches that resulted from scripted storylines, where wrestlers portrayed villains, heroes, or less distinguishable characters in scripted events that built tension and culminated in a wrestling match or series of matches, with results predetermined by WWE's writers. Storylines between the characters played out on WWE's primary television programs, Raw and SmackDown.

At SummerSlam, Brock Lesnar defeated John Cena to win the WWE World Heavyweight Championship. On the August 19 edition of Main Event, a rematch was scheduled for Night of Champions.

At SummerSlam, Paige won the WWE Divas Championship against AJ Lee. On the September 1 episode of Raw, Stephanie McMahon granted Nikki Bella a title match at Night of Champions, but they were interrupted by AJ, who reminded Stephanie of her rematch. On September 5, Stephanie decided that Paige would defend the title against AJ and Nikki in a Triple threat match.

On same show, Dolph Ziggler, who at SummerSlam had defeated The Miz for the WWE Intercontinental Championship, lost a rematch by countout. On the September 2 episode of Main Event, another title defense against The Miz was scheduled for the event.

On the August 25 episode of Raw, Cesaro by defeated Rob Van Dam and thus became the number one contender for the WWE United States Championship, held by Sheamus.

On the August 18 episode of Raw, Mark Henry attacked Rusev, who retaliated on September 1 of Raw, by attacking Henry during a match pitting Henry and Big Show against Erick Rowan and Luke Harper. On the September 5 edition of SmackDown, Henry challenged Rusev to a match at Night of Champions, with Lana accepting on Rusev's behalf.

On the August 18 episode of Raw, Gold and Stardust defeated WWE Tag Team Champions The Usos in a non-title match. A week later, Goldust and Stardust won a title match by count-out and attacked The Usos after the match. Goldust and Stardust attacked the Usos again after their respective matches against Jey Uso and Jimmy Uso on the following episodes of SmackDown and Raw, resulting in Jey Uso injuring his leg. On September 8, the Usos were scheduled to defend the titles against Gold and Stardust at the event.

On the September 1 episode of Raw, Chris Jericho insulted Randy Orton on his Highlight Reel show. A week later, Orton attacked Jericho who was being medically treated after losing to Bray Wyatt in a steel cage match. On September 9, a match between Jericho and Orton was scheduled for the event.

Event

Pre-show

On the pre-show, Christian returned to host the "Peep" Show, with Chris Jericho as the show's guest. Analysis was provided by a pre-show panel of Booker T, Alex Riley, Big Show, and Renee Young.

Preliminary matches
The actual pay-per-view opened with The Usos (Jimmy Uso and Jey Uso) defending the WWE Tag Team Championship against Goldust and Stardust. The Usos dominated throughout the match until Jey attempted a Samoan splash on Stardust but landed on Stardust's raised knee. Stardust immediately rolled up Jey for a pinfall, thus winning the titles.

Next, Sheamus defended the United States Championship against Cesaro. In the end, after an evenly contested match, Sheamus executed a Brogue Kick on Cesaro to retain the title.

After that, Dolph Ziggler (accompanied by R-Ziggler) defended the Intercontinental Championship against The Miz(accompanied by Damien Mizdow. Miz rolled up Ziggler while holding his tights to win the match and his fourth Intercontinental Championship.

The next match on the card was scheduled between Roman Reigns and Seth Rollins.
The match was cancelled the day before the event, as Reigns was rushed to the hospital for surgery on an incarcerated hernia, and was deemed unable to compete.  Rollins walked to the ring to claim a victory against via forfeit. While in the ring, Dean Ambrose attacked Rollins. The Authority emerged from backstage to separate the two and restore order. Security later tied Ambrose's hands behind his back and escorted him out of the arena.

In the fifth match, before the match Lillian Garcia sang the American Anthem. Rusev (accompanied by Lana) faced Mark Henry. During the match, Henry executed The World's Strongest Slam, but couldn't capitalize. In the end, Henry submitted to The Accolade.

In the next match, Randy Orton faced Chris Jericho. In the end, Jericho executed a Codebreaker on Orton for a nearfall. Jericho dove off the top rope but Orton countered into a mid-air RKO and pinned Jericho to win the match.

In the penultimate match, Paige defended the Divas Championship in a triple threat match against Nikki Bella and AJ Lee. After leaving Bella unconscious out of the ring, Lee forced Paige to submit to the Black Widow to win the title. With this win, Lee tied the record for most reigns alongside Eve Torres with three.

Main event
In the main event, Brock Lesnar (accompanied by Paul Heyman) defended the WWE World Heavyweight Championship against John Cena. Cena executed an Attitude Adjustment on Lesnar, who kicked out at one. Lesnar then applied the Kimura Lock four times, but Cena reached the ropes to break the submission each time. Later in the match, Cena performed a second Attitude Adjustment on Lesnar for a nearfall. Cena later applied the STF, however, Lesnar countered. As Lesnar applied a fifth Kimura Lock on Cena, Cena escaped by repeatedly driving Lesnar into the corner. Cena then executed a third Attitude Adjustment on Lesnar and applied a second STF, only for Lesnar to reach the ropes. Cena applied a third STF, but Lesnar again reached the ropes. Cena then locked Lesnar in a fourth STF, but Cena let Lesnar out of the hold when he refused to submit. In the end, Cena executed a fourth Attitude Adjustment on Lesnar. As Cena went for the cover, Seth Rollins emerged to attack Cena with the Money in the Bank briefcase, causing a disqualification. Rollins attacked Lesnar with a Curb Stomp and then attempted to cash in his contract but Cena attacked and drove him away before the match could actually begin. Lesnar then executed an F-5 on Cena to close the show, still WWE World Heavyweight Champion.

Reception
Night of Champions received mostly positive reviews. The Sheamus vs. Cesaro match was highly acclaimed. James Caldwell of Pro Wrestling Torch gave the main event 3.75 out of 5 stars, calling it a "solid title match". However, he complained about the Intercontinental and Divas title changes. Dave Meltzer of the Wrestling Observer Newsletter referred to the US Title match and the Orton vs. Jericho match as "excellent matches." About the US Title match, he said it looked "like a G-1 match with a lot of stiff blows and reversals back-and-forth."

Aftermath
The following night on Raw, The Miz defended his Intercontinental title against Dolph Ziggler in a Night of Champions rematch. Ziggler regained the title after rolling up The Miz with a handful of tights. During his weekly interview with Michael Cole, Triple H scheduled a battle royal for the September 26 episode of SmackDown, with the winner receiving a title match against Ziggler later in the night.

Also on Raw, Mark Henry addressed his loss to Rusev, but was interrupted by Rusev and Lana. A rematch between Rusev and Henry took place afterwards, with Rusev again victorious.

WWE Tag Team Champions The Usos (Jey Uso and Jimmy Uso) teamed with Sheamus to take on and defeat Cesaro, Goldust, and Stardust on the following Raw.

Results

References

External links

 Official website

Events in Nashville, Tennessee
2014
2014 WWE Network events
2014 in Tennessee
Professional wrestling in Nashville, Tennessee
2014 WWE pay-per-view events
September 2014 events in the United States